The German–Polish declaration of non-aggression, also known as the German–Polish non-aggression pact, was a non-aggression agreement between Nazi Germany and the Second Polish Republic that was signed on 26 January 1934 in Berlin. Both countries pledged to resolve their problems by bilateral negotiations and to forgo armed conflict for a period of 10 years. The agreement effectively normalised relations between Poland and Germany, which had been strained by border disputes arising from the territorial settlement in the Treaty of Versailles. Germany effectively recognised Poland's borders and moved to end an economically-damaging customs war between the two countries that had taken place over the previous decade.

Background
Before 1933, Poland had worried that some sort of alliance would take place between German Weimar Republic and the Soviet Union to the detriment of Poland. Therefore, Poland made a military alliance with France in 1921. Because the Nazis and the Communists were bitter enemies, a hostile Soviet-German alliance after Hitler came to power in 1933 seemed very unlikely. 

In 1925, under the Locarno treaties, it was agreed that France would never send forces into Germany outside of its own occupation zone in the Rhineland and that both Britain and Italy would guarantee the Franco-German border against any attempt to change it from either side. The purpose of the Locarno treaties was to make it impossible for France to occupy the Ruhr as had happened in 1923. From the Polish perspective, the Locarno treaties were a diplomatic disaster, as Britain and Italy refused to make the same guarantees for Germany's eastern border while theoretically both Britain and Italy would declare war on France if the French should move French Army troops into Germany beyond the Rhineland. Under the terms of the Franco-Polish defensive alliance of 1921, France was supposed to start an offensive from the Rhineland occupation zone into the north German plain if Germany should invade Poland, but the Locarno treaties had effectively gutted the provisions of the Franco-Polish alliance. The British Foreign Secretary Austen Chamberlain had pushed for the Locarno treaties as a way for Germany to peacefully revise the Treaty of Versailles in eastern Europe. Chamberlain believed that as long as the Poles had a great power like France as their ally, they would never hand over the areas that Germany was claiming such as the Polish Corridor and Upper Silesia, but if Franco-German relations improved, then that would weaken the Franco-Polish alliance and force the Poles to yield to the force majeure of Germany's power. From the early 1920s onward, British foreign policy aimed to revise aspects of the Treaty of Versailles in favor of the Reich, such as the eastern borders Versailles had imposed on Germany, in exchange for German acceptance of the other aspects of the Versailles settlement of which the British approved. The way that the French largely yielded to British demands at the Locarno conference was seen as a betrayal in Poland. 

The French Foreign Minister Aristide Briand carried out a foreign policy aimed at a rapprochement with Germany, which caused much alarm in Warsaw. As long as the Rhineland was occupied by the French Army, it served as a form of "collateral" if Germany should violate the Treaty of Versailles and placed the French in a strong position to launch an offensive to the Ruhr and launch an offensive into the North German Plain. In 1928, Briand accepted the offer by German Foreign Minister Gustav Stresemann that France would end the occupation of the Rhineland five years early with the French to pull out of the Rhineland by June 1930 instead of June 1935 as the Treaty of Versailles had called for. Briand's plans for an early end of the Rhineland occupation in exchange for better relations with the Reich were vehemently opposed by Polish diplomats, who wanted the French to stay in the Rhineland until 1935. The Poles did not expect the Germans to abide by the Treaty of Versailles, and it was believed that with the end of the French occupation that the Rhineland would remilitarized in the near-future.. In turn, if the Germans constructed defensive works along the Franco-German border, that in turn would allow Germany to focus its might entirely against Poland. Besides for opposing the plans for an early end of the Rhineland occupation, Piłsudski wanted France to strengthen its alliance with Poland, and was much offended when Briand rejected his plans as he preferred better relations with Berlin over Warsaw.   

It has been said that Piłsudski's reason for seeking the declaration with Germany was his concern over France's Maginot Line. Until 1929, French plans had called for a French offensive into the North German Plain, in conjunction with offensives from Poland and Czechoslovakia. The construction of the Maginot Line, which began in 1929, indicated the French Army's preference for a strictly-defensive stance, which would leave its eastern allies on their own (That is exactly what happened in 1939 during the Phoney War). From Piłsudski's viewpoint, in the light of France's military plans, a non-aggression agreement with Germany would be the best choice for Poland. 

One of the most noted of Józef Piłsudski's foreign policies was his rumoured proposal to France to declare war on Germany after Adolf Hitler had come to power, in January 1933. Some historians speculate that Piłsudski may have sounded out France on the possibility of joint military action against Germany, which had been openly rearming in violation of the Treaty of Versailles. France's refusal might have been one of the reasons that Poland signed the declaration. However, the argument that the declaration had been forced on Piłsudski by French refusal to wage a "preventive war" has been disputed by historians, who point out that there is no evidence in French or Polish diplomatic archives that such a proposal was ever advanced.. Under the terms of the Treaty of Locarno, if France invaded Germany, both Italy and Britain would had declared war on France. Historians noted that when in late October 1933, rumours of a Polish "preventive-war" proposal were reported in Paris, their source was the Polish embassy, which had informed French reporters that Poland had proposed a "preventive war" to France and Belgium, but Poland and Germany had already been secretly negotiating. It has been argued that Piłsudski had the Polish embassy start rumours about a "preventive war" to pressure the Germans, who were demanding for Poland to abrogate its 1921 Franco-Polish alliance. The declaration would specifically exclude that alliance.

Piłsudski distrusted German intentions on the whole but perceived Hitler's origins as an Austrian, rather than an anti-Polish Prussian, as a mitigating factor. He was quoted by the French military attaché in 1933 as stating that Hitler should stay in power as long as possible. However, he was also quoted by his wife as stating that the pact had only postponed a conflict with Germany and given Poland time to prepare.

Negotiations
A detente began between Poland and Germany in early 1933. On the Polish side this was promoted by Beck making what Moltke interpreted as "a veiled proposal for direct contact with Germany" in April 1933. Hitler for his part encouraged this by stating on 2 May 1933 by saying to Wysocki that he did not "...share the view that questions Poland's right to exist...", and then on 17 May saying in a speech to the Reichstag that he did not believe that it was possible to "...make Germans out of Poles...". This was followed by a lessening of tensions around Danzig in July 1933, with Piłsudski instructing Beck to explore options for further talks. In September of the same year talks were held between Beck on the Polish side, and Neurath and Goebbels on the German side, as part of the general conclave on disarmament in Geneva.

The German-Polish rapprochement was temporarily interrupted by the German withdrawal from the Geneva disarmament talks in October 1933. However, by the next month the Polish ambassador in Berlin had already asked Hitler whether the loss of security caused to Poland by Germany's exit from the talks might be compensated by "...direct German-Polish relations...". Hitler responded to this by stating that he saw Poland as "an outpost against Asia", and proposed a declaration excluding the possibility of war between the two countries. The German side proposed a draft declaration to this effect that was accepted in principle by the Polish government, and after a month the talks on the text of the agreement were quickly concluded in January 1934.

The declaration

Naming
	
The German foreign ministry insisted that the agreement be called a "declaration" rather than a "pact" as "pact" was seen as implying that there was no conflict of interest between the parties. Additionally, the Germans believed that the term "pact" might imply recognition of the German-Polish border. Despite this the agreement is still referred to as a "pact" in some documents.

Effect of the declaration

Under the declaration, Poland and Germany agreed to normalise relations. Until the declaration Germany had withheld normalisation without first settling the question of the German-Polish border. Instead the issue of the border, and particularly of the Danzig Corridor was put to one side and both sides agreed not to use force to settle their dispute. The agreement also included clauses guarding Poland's relations with France under the Franco-Polish alliance, and under their membership of the League of Nations.

An additional benefit Poland received from the declaration was that it enabled the Polish foreign minister, Józef Beck, to have a line of direct communication with Berlin regarding developments in the Free City of Danzig. This allowed Beck to avoid having to communicate directly with the League of Nations regarding the city, which was then governed by the League of Nations high commissioner, Seán Lester. Poland was also able to extract a promise by Germany to accept a quota of Polish coal during the negotiation of the agreement.

For Germany, the agreement was the first major Concordat reached during the Nazi era, and gave Adolf Hitler an agreement that he could present domestically as a diplomatic success, and internationally as a sign of his pacific intent. It also helped signal a weakening in the French-led alliances surrounding Germany, particularly through the secrecy in which it had been negotiated.

Aftermath

International reactions
The British government was generally pleased by the German-Polish declaration. They believed this removed a dangerous threat to peace. 

In Czechoslovakia the agreement angered the Czechoslovak political elite. Announcement of the declaration came just four days after discussions between Jozef Beck and the Czech foreign minister, Edvard Beneš. Beneš, speaking to Joseph Addison (the British ambassador in Prague), claimed that the agreement was a "stab in the back" and went on to say that it showed that Poland was a "useless country" that deserved another partition. At the time Beneš was particularly angered by reports in the Polish government-controlled and right-wing press accusing the Czechs of mistreating Poles in the Zaolzie region and perceived Polish encouragement of Slovak nationalists.

The conclusion of the declaration led to accusations from France that the French government had not been kept fully advised of the progress of negotiations between Poland and Germany. The French government had been kept informed of progress during the preliminary phase of the talks in late 1933, but this had not been kept up during the later part of the talks, though the French were given a detailed explanation of the agreement and its motives by the Polish government soon after it being signed. French public opinion about the agreement was negative. French critics of the deal believed it indicated that Poland might be an unreliable ally.
 
The signing of the treaty came as a surprise to the US government despite the US administration's previous advocacy of a Polish-German agreement. Some sections of US public opinion also saw the agreement as signalling Polish support for Germany. 

Similarly the signing of the agreement caused concern in the USSR, with commentary in Izvestia questioning whether the agreement represented a concession by Germany or was simply a German manoeuvre, and expressing the belief that the agreement was merely temporary. To allay any fears of a war against the Soviet Union, on 5 May 1934, Poland renewed the Soviet–Polish Non-Aggression Pact, which had been first signed on 25 July 1932. It was extended until 31 December 1945 despite Hitler’s repeated suggestion to form a German-Polish alliance against the Soviets. A report on the declaration by the Soviet ambassador in Warsaw, Vladimir Osvieyenko, pointed out that the agreement contained no secret terms.

German denunciation
German policy changed drastically in late 1938, after the annexation of Sudetenland sealed the fate of Czechoslovakia, and Poland became Hitler's next target. In October 1938, German Foreign Minister Joachim Ribbentrop presented Poland with the proposition of renewing the agreement in exchange for allowing the Free City of Danzig to be annexed by Germany and the construction of an extraterritorial motorway and railway through the Polish Corridor, with Germany accepting Poland's postwar borders. Since Poland refused, Hitler denounced the declaration unilaterally on 28 April 1939 during an address before the Reichstag while Germany renewed its territorial claims in Poland. A note to Poland from the German government on 28 April 1939 expressed the view that their denunciation was justified by the signing of the Anglo-Polish alliance. After another few months of rising tension and the Molotov–Ribbentrop Pact between Germany and the Soviet Union, which contained a secret protocol by which Hitler and Stalin agreed to divide Poland between them, Germany invaded Poland on 1 September 1939 which initiated World War II, with the Soviets invading Poland shortly after on 17 September 1939.

Legacy

Historiography
The historical significance of the agreement has been a matter of controversy. The British historian Hugh Seton-Watson, writing in 1945, stated that the 1934 declaration “marked the beginning of German-Polish active cooperation in an aggressive policy in Eastern Europe.” Similarly AJP Taylor writing in his 1961 book The Origins of the Second World War considered that the declaration had removed the possibility of Polish support for France, thus freeing Hitler to take further actions. 

Later historians have been less critical of the agreement. The American historian Anna Cienciala wrote in 1975 that the agreement, together with the Polish-Soviet non-aggression pact, formed a "policy of equilibrium" whereby Poland's leadership sought to preserve Poland's independence by balancing Poland's relations with Germany and the Soviet Union and thus avoid coming under the control of either, and pointed to Pilsudski's refusal on multiple occasions to ally with Germany against the Soviet Union as evidence of this. Piotr S. Wandycz writing in 1986 criticised the view of AJP Taylor as giving insufficient weight to the assurances the declaration gave regarding Poland's alliance with France, and not taking into account that both Beck and Piłsudski were aware that the agreement would not hold for long. Wandycz also noted that Taylor had not had the advantage of seeing later-published material in which Piłsudski had expressed his view on the declaration to close associates.

Russia
On 1 September 2009, on the 70th anniversary of the beginning of the Second World War, Russia's foreign intelligence agency, the SVR, declassified documents it said were gathered by undercover agents between 1935 and 1945 allegedly showing that Poland secretly conspired with Germany against the Soviet Union. The SVR claimed that Poland had pursued an anti-Soviet foreign policy from the mid-1930s. The documents were compiled by a former senior KGB officer who cited a report from an unidentified Soviet agent purporting that in 1934, Poland and Germany had agreed a secret protocol whereby Poland would remain neutral if Germany attacked the Soviet Union. In response, Polish historians said that there was no evidence that this protocol existed. Mariusz Wolos, an academic at the Polish Academy of Sciences stated that "Nothing similar has ever turned up in archives in Germany. Just because some agent wrote it doesn't mean it's true. There isn't much new here. The documents [released by the SVR] simply confirm what British, German and Russian historians already know".

References

Sources 
 .

 Anna M. Cienciala, "The Foreign Policy of Józef Piłsudski and Józef Beck, 1926-1939: Misconceptions and Interpretations," The Polish Review (2011) 56#1 pp. 111–151 in JSTOR

External links 

 Text of the treaty 
 text about Polish foreign policy 

1934 in Germany
1934 in Poland
Germany–Poland relations
Interwar-period treaties
Treaties concluded in 1934
Treaties entered into force in 1934
Treaties of Nazi Germany
Treaties of the Second Polish Republic